Sari Saarelainen (born 1 March 1981) is a Finnish former racing cyclist, who now works as a directeur sportif for UCI Women's WorldTeam . She competed in the 2013 UCI women's road race in Florence.

Saarelainen originally stopped competing in cycling at the end of 2004. However, she returned to competition in 2010 after becoming a mother.

Personal life
Outside of cycling she works as a cycling coach and physical training and she is an entrepreneur of a gym and a bike distribution, and she is also a singer and songwriter.

Major results
Source: 

1998
 3rd Road race, National Road Championships
 5th Time trial, UCI Junior Road World Championships
2000
 4th Tour de Berne
2001
 1st  Time trial, National Road Championships
2002
 2nd Time trial, National Road Championships
2003
 3rd Time trial, National Road Championships
2010
 2nd Road race, National Road Championships
2013
 1st  Time trial, National Road Championships
2014
 2nd Road race, National Road Championships
 6th Overall 4Tour of Zhoushan Island
 9th Grand Prix el Salvador
 9th GP du Canton d'Argovie
2015
 3rd Time trial, National Road Championships
2016
 National Road Championships
2nd Time trial
3rd Road race
 4th VR Women ITT
 7th Horizon Park Women Challenge
2017
 National Road Championships
2nd Time trial
3rd Road race
2018
 3rd Time trial, National Road Championships
2019
 2nd Time trial, National Road Championships

References

External links

Discogs profile

1981 births
Living people
Finnish female cyclists
Place of birth missing (living people)
Cyclists at the 2015 European Games
European Games competitors for Finland